Bukky Bakray (born 2002) is a British actress and writer. She is known for her breakthrough debut role in the 2019 coming-of-age drama film Rocks. At 18, she became the youngest BAFTA Rising Star Award recipient as well as one of the youngest Best Actress in a Leading Role nominees. She appeared on the 2021 Forbes 30 Under 30 list.

She was discovered at school when she was 15 by director Sarah Gavron. Bakray has upcoming roles in the film Self-Charm directed by Ella Greenwood, the BBC One series You Don't Know Me, and the Apple TV+ series Liaison.

Early life and education
Bakray was born in Hackney, East London to Christian Nigerian parents and grew up on an estate in Lower Clapton near where Rocks was filmed. She has three brothers and a sister who lives in South Africa. She attended Clapton Girls' Academy and Cardinal Pole Catholic School.

Bakray joined the RADA Youth Company and enrolled in the Originate Actor Training programme at Theatre Peckham.

Bibliography
Essay in Black Joy, edited by Charlie Brinkhurst-Cuff and Timi Sotire (2021)

Filmography

Film

Television

Accolades

See also
List of British actors

References

External links

Living people
2002 births
Actresses from London
BAFTA Rising Star Award winners
Black British actresses
English child actresses
English people of Nigerian descent
People from Lower Clapton